San Giustino is a comune (municipality) in the Province of Perugia in the Italian region Umbria, located about  northwest of Perugia on the Tiber River.

History

In ancient Roman times it was a town named Meliscianum.

Nearby at Colle Plinio a large elaborate ancient Roman villa that belonged to the Plinys, Pliny the Elder and Pliny the Younger.

Later history

The frazione of Cospaia was a small independent republic from 1440 until 1826.

Geography

Located in north of Umbria, next to the borders with Tuscany and Marche, the municipality borders with Borgo Pace (PU), Citerna, Città di Castello, Mercatello sul Metauro (PU) and Sansepolcro (AR). It counts the hamlets (frazioni) of Celalba, Cospaia, Selci-Lama and Uselle-Renzetti.

International relations

Twin towns — Sister cities
San Giustino is twinned with:
 Prudnik, Poland
 Carros, France

References

External links

 San Giustino official website
 https://commons.wikimedia.org/wiki/File:San_Giustino,_Family_Bufalini_1491_-_1782.pdf

Cities and towns in Umbria
Roman villas in Italy